Pre-mRNA-splicing regulator WTAP is a protein that in humans is encoded by the WTAP gene.

The Wilms tumor suppressor gene WT1 appears to play a role in both transcriptional and posttranscriptional regulation of certain cellular genes. This gene encodes a WT1-associating protein, which is a ubiquitously expressed nuclear protein. Like WT1 protein, this protein is localized throughout the nucleoplasm as well as in speckles and partially colocalizes with splicing factors. Alternative splicing of this gene results in three transcript variants, two of which encode the same isoform.

Interactions
WTAP (gene) has been shown to interact with WT1.

References

Further reading